Ahmed Abed (born March 30, 1990) is an Israeli footballer who plays as a forward for Israeli Premier League club Maccabi Bnei Reineh.

Career
Abed started his career at Maccabi Ahi Nazareth youth system. On December 31, 2008 he made his debut at the senior team against Hapoel Ra'anana.

In summer 2011 he moved to Hapoel Ironi Kiryat Shmona, he won with the club the Toto Cup and the Israeli Championship. On May 7, 2014 Abed scored the winning goal in the final Cup victory 1–0 against Maccabi Netanya at the 97th minute.

On January 29, Abed signed in Giresunspor.

International
On November 14, 2012 he made his debut at the Israel U21 against Belarus. Abed got his first call up to the senior Israel side for a 2018 FIFA World Cup qualifier against Macedonia in October 2016.

Honours

Club
Hapoel Kiryat Shmona
Israeli Premier League: 2011–12
Israel State Cup: 2013–14
Toto Cup Top Division: 2011-12
Israel Super Cup: 2015

References

External links
 
 

1990 births
Living people
Israeli footballers
Israel international footballers
Israel under-21 international footballers
Arab-Israeli footballers
Arab citizens of Israel
Maccabi Ahi Nazareth F.C. players
Hapoel Ironi Kiryat Shmona F.C. players
Giresunspor footballers
Hapoel Tel Aviv F.C. players
Maccabi Bnei Reineh F.C. players
Expatriate footballers in Turkey
Israeli expatriate sportspeople in Turkey
Footballers from Nazareth
Liga Leumit players
Israeli Premier League players
Association football midfielders